The Conflicts of Interest Board (NYC COIB) is the independent New York City agency tasked with administering, enforcing and interpreting Chapter 68 of the New York City Charter, the City's Conflicts of Interest Law, and the City's Annual Disclosure Law.  The agency has made news for its active Twitter feed, encouraging those within its jurisdiction to contact the agency via memes.

References

Government of New York City
Conflict of interest mitigation